Peter Norton Townsend (15 February 1910 – 9 May 1995) was an English first-class cricketer.

The son of the cricketer Charlie Townsend, he was born in February 1910 at Norton, County Durham. He was educated at Winchester College, before going up to New College, Oxford. While studying at Oxford, he played first-class cricket for Oxford University in 1929, making two appearances against the touring South Africans and Nottinghamshire. He scored 16 runs in his two matches, while with his leg break bowling he took 3 wickets. After graduating from Oxford, he became a solicitor. Townsend died at Bromley in May 1995. Coming from a large cricketing family, several relatives played cricket at first-class level, with his father and brother, David, playing Test cricket for England.

References

External links

1910 births
1995 deaths
People from Norton, County Durham
Cricketers from County Durham
People educated at Winchester College
Alumni of New College, Oxford
English cricketers
Oxford University cricketers
English solicitors
20th-century English lawyers